The 2020 ITTF Women's World Cup was a table tennis competition held in Weihai, China, from 8 to 10 November 2020. It was the 24th edition of the ITTF-sanctioned event.
After series of cancellation of tournaments due to the impact of the COVID-19 pandemic on sports this year, the ITTF World Cup is one of the three year-end tournaments that conclude the table tennis calendar in 2020. The other two, 2020 ITTF Finals and the inaugural World Table Tennis Macao, were also all held in November in China.

Qualification
In total, 21 players qualified for the World Cup:

 The current World Champion
 18 players from the five Continental Cups held during 2020
 A wild card, selected by the ITTF

A maximum of two players from each association could qualify.

Competition format
The tournament consisted of two stages: a preliminary group stage and a knockout stage. The players seeded 9 to 21 were drawn into four groups. The top two players from each group then joined the top eight seeded players in the second stage of the competition, which consisted of a knockout draw.

Seeding
The seeding list was based on the official ITTF world ranking for November 2020.

Preliminary stage
The preliminary group stage took place on 8 November, with the top two players in each group progressing to the main draw.

Main draw
The knockout stage took place from 9–10 November.

See also
2020 World Team Table Tennis Championships
2020 ITTF World Tour
2020 ITTF Finals
2020 ITTF Men's World Cup

References

External links
Tournament page on ITTF website

Women
World Cup (women)
Table tennis competitions in China
ITTF Women's World Cup
ITTF Women's World Cup